Darren Aksel Jensen (born May 27, 1960) is a Canadian former professional ice hockey goaltender who played two seasons in the National Hockey League (NHL) for the Philadelphia Flyers.

Playing career
Jensen was a college goaltender with the Fighting Hawks at University of North Dakota, and won the NCAA Tournament with them in 1980 and 1982.

Jensen was selected by the Hartford Whalers in the fifth round of the 1980 NHL Entry Draft. However, he did not sign with Hartford and became a free agent, signing with the Flyers in 1985. He made his debut in the 1984–85 season, but lost the only game he played, and was sent to the Hershey Bears of the American Hockey League (AHL) for the remainder of the season.

After Pelle Lindbergh's death in 1985, Jensen was called up from Hershey to become the backup for newly promoted starting goalie, Bob Froese, winning his first game of the season against the Edmonton Oilers. Froese and Jensen were co-winners of the 1986 William M. Jennings Trophy for allowing the fewest goals in the NHL that season. After the Flyers obtained Chico Resch, Jensen was sent back to the minor leagues near the trading deadline, and finished his career with Hershey, the Fredericton Express and Milwaukee Admirals.

Post-NHL
After his retirement, Jensen pursued a number of business ventures in his native British Columbia. He also served as a hockey coach in the area, including a stint as an assistant coach for the Summerland Steam of the Kootenay International Junior Hockey League.

Awards and honors

Career statistics

Regular season and playoffs

References

External links
 

1960 births
Canadian ice hockey goaltenders
Fredericton Express players
Fort Wayne Komets players
Hartford Whalers draft picks
Hershey Bears players
Ice hockey people from British Columbia
Living people
Milwaukee Admirals (IHL) players
North Dakota Fighting Hawks men's ice hockey players
Philadelphia Flyers players
William M. Jennings Trophy winners
NCAA men's ice hockey national champions